Australian rules football is played by a six-team league in Scotland, with clubs in Glasgow, Linlithgow, Kirkcaldy, Edinburgh and Newcastle. Current competition has its origins in the 1990s with the founding of the Caledonian Sharks (later Glasgow Sharks).

Scottish involvement had a major influence on the sport's development in its earliest days, coordinating the very first competition and trophy, the Caledonian Challenge Cup in 1861, establishing Australian rules football in Queensland in 1866 and one of the game's earliest and most successful clubs, the Essendon Football Club in 1872. The game was first established in Edinburgh in 1888 by students from Edinburgh University .

Edinburgh has hosted the EU Cup, including the 2012 tournament and most recently in 2022. The national team's best result is 3rd at the tournament in 2014 and 2022. In all other international tournaments, Scotland competes as part of the Great Britain side.

Scottish players have featured in the Australian Football League the first being Thomas Leather in 1932.

Early history
There are rumours of a competition near the River Clyde during the early 20th Century, famously referred to in A Game of their Own, where a number of expatriate Australians were based in Scotland either as Ship Workers or Soldiers. Had this league existed, and there is no proof it ever did, then it had died out around the time of the First World War.

Scottish involvement in early years of Australian rules in Australia

Scots living in Melbourne and Victoria in the mid-19th century were greatly involved in the formation of the rules of the game, as well as the formation of a number of early clubs.  

The very first competition and trophy in 1861 was the instigation of the Royal Caledonian Society and known as the Caledonian Challenge Cup. 

David Watterston of Balgone Barns, Haddingtonshire learned the game upon migrating to Melbourne, but importantly was founder of the Brisbane Football Club which commenced Australian rules football in Queensland in 1866. the second British colony to take up the sport.

One club formed by Scots was the Essendon Football Club (participating in the elite Australian Football League) formed in 1872 which was founded by Robert McCracken, born in Ayrshire, Scotland, who emigrated at the age of 28. The now-defunct Glasgow Redbacks wore black jumpers with a red diagonal stripe across the front, the same as worn by Essendon Football Club said to recognise the Scottish roots of Essendon.

First introduction
As early as April 1888 students at Edinburgh University (mostly Australian) had formed a team. The team contested a match in England against London University on 14 April 1888. Reports in July 1889 from Australia appear to indicate that the sport continued for a time in Edinburgh, but that the Edinburgh team "wiped out every competing team". Records of any team beyond this appear not to have survived.

Earliest clubs and Establishment of the SARFL: 1990s-Present
During the 1990s the Caledonian Sharks were set up by John Boland, with the travelling restraints at the time club games lessened over the years until a period of inactivity until being adopted and rebranded as the Glasgow Sharks by Andrew Butler in 2003.  The Edinburgh Puffins and modern SARFL came about through the work of Andrew Butler and Richard Prentice, former players with BARFL side, North London Lions.  Butler and Prentice began plans for the SARFL in the winter of 2003.  Intra city friendlies began in early 2003 and a combined rules match against Edinburgh Gaelic side Dunedin Connolleys.  The Puffins made their debut in the 2003 Northern Cup tournament staged in St Helens. The side remained unbeaten against the then St Helens Miners and Wandsworth Demons. Later in 2003, the Puffins staged a home and away series against Oxford University winning both hard-fought games. The inaugural SARFL season was held in 2004 with a league consisting of two sides in Edinburgh and one in Glasgow. The Puffins name, originally conceived by inaugural Edinburgh Puffins coach Gavin England was subsequently conferred upon the Scottish national team. Later in 2010 the Scottish Puffins were rebranded as the Scottish Clansmen.

In 2006, Glasgow and Edinburgh considered competing in the BARFL Regional competition, though travel problems saw them continue an expanded SARFL local competition with the Glasgow Redbacks and Middlesbrough Hawks from northern England joining the league.  The Hawks left the league in 2007 to join the northern division of Aussie Rules UK, and the Scottish league had difficulty in operating on more than a social match level in 2008.

The league was relaunched in 2009, with the Glasgow and Edinburgh playing bases consolidated to one club in each city.  They were joined by a new club in Aberdeen, named the "Aberdingoes".

Current clubs
The following teams are active in Scotland:
 Edinburgh Bloods 2003–present
 Glasgow Sharks 2003–present
 Aberdeen Eagles 2009–2013 (known as the Dingoes until 2011)
 Kingdom Kangaroos 2013–present
 Glasgow Giants ARFC 2015–present
 Falkirk Silverbacks 2015–2016
 West Lothian Eagles 2016–present
 Tyne Tees Tigers (based in Newcastle but plays in Scottish leagues) 2018- present

Haggis Cup

Scottish National Team

The Scottish national team, The Clansmen, compete in 1–3 events per calendar year. These events are typically the Tri-Nations Championship, the AFL Europe Euro Cup and an additional challenge match or friendly tournament across the European continent.

Euro Cup Participation
Formally known as the EU Cup, for which Scotland participated the inaugural event in London 2005, again in Prague 2008 and also in Zagreb 2009. Since becoming the Euro Cup in 2010 Scotland has participated in a further 6 of the 8 AFL Europe Euro Cup competitions to date, these were; Milan 2010; Belfast 2011; Edinburgh 2012; London 2014; Lisbon 2016 and; Bordeaux 2017.

The Scottish Clansmens strongest Euro Cup performance was in Belfast 2011, winning their group with wins over Spain and Finland and finishing 6th over all in the tournament.

Scotland in Euro Cup

Edinburgh 2012

Pool Stage:
 Scotland (45) d. Norway (2) 
 England (49) d. Scotland (17) 
 Denmark (40) d. Scotland (16)  
Scotland progress to the Bowl Semi-Finals
 France (36) d. Scotland (21) 
Bordeaux 2017

Pool Stage:
 Ireland (79) d. Scotland (8) 
 Netherlands (37) d. Scotland (36) 
Scotland progress to the Plate Quarter-Finals
 Scotland (63) d. Russia (5)  
Scotland progress to the Plate Semi-Finals
 Scotland (33) d. Jerusalem (19)  
Scotland progress to the Plate Final
 Czech Republic (36) d. Scotland (6)

Audience

Television
ESPN (UK) and British Eurosport are the current holders of the British rights to the Australian Football League (AFL). ESPN shows three live games each round of the season including the playoffs and the AFL Grand Final. Eurosport shows one game a week but the coverage is delayed.

Players

Men's

Thomas Leather (Scottish born)
Bill Morris (Scottish father)
Charlie Norris (Scottish father)
James Aitken (Scottish father)
James Duncan Gordon (Scottish father)
Ewan Thompson (Scottish born)
Sean Wight (Scottish born)
Roy Cazaly (Scottish mother)
Alex Lang (Scottish father) 
Luke McGuane
Rhys Palmer (Scottish father)
Firth McCallum (Scottish father)
Paul Stewart (Scottish father)
John Bell (Scottish parents)
Doug Fraser (Scottish parents)
Bill Proudfoot (Scottish parents)
Andy Dougall (Scottish parents)
Stan Reid (Scottish father)
Ted McLean (Scottish father)
Colin Campbell (Scottish father)
Les MacPherson (Scottish father)
Alick Ogilvie (Scottish father)
Grant Lawrie (Scottish parents)
Alexander John Fraser (Scottish parents)
Alex Barlow (Scottish born)
Matthew Dick (Scottish born)
Bob Edmond (Scottish born)
Brian Cook (Scottish born)
Henry McPetrie (Scottish born)
William Marshall (Scottish born)
Jim Edmond (Scottish born)
Bruce Sloss (Scottish father)
Stanley McKenzie (Scottish mother)
Hugh Plowman (Scottish father) 
Ramsay Anderson (Scottish born)
George Sutherland (Scottish born)
Norman Doig (Scottish parents)
Bob Cameron (Scottish parents)
Stewart Geddes (Scottish parents)
Jordan Schroder (Scottish mother)
Aaron Young (Scottish father)

Women's

See also

Australian rules football in the United Kingdom
Sport in Scotland

References

External links
 AFL Scotland official site (seems to be no longer maintained, viewed June 2019)
 AFL Scotland official  Facebook page (is updated, viewed June 2019)